Nordica, part of the Nordic Aviation Group AS, is the state-owned Estonian flag carrier, a CPA capacity provider, headquartered in Tallinn, with its office premises in the vicinity of Tallinn Airport. The company operates both scheduled flights and operations under wet-lease contracts on behalf of other European airlines. Nordica also operates PSOs.

History

The company was founded on 25 September 2015, subsequent to a decision of the Estonian Government to form a new airline after the liquidation of the previous national carrier, Estonian Air, due to bankruptcy. The symbolic first flight left Tallinn for Amsterdam on 8 November 2015, operated by wet-lease partner BMI Regional. The first flight with Estonian service on board on the same route took off on 20 January 2016.

Currently, the company reuses the IATA code (EE) and call-sign (REVAL) of Aero Airlines, which ceased operations in early 2008.

On 30 March 2016, a new brand name – Nordica – was officially announced and published in the media. According to the company, the airline's name derives from Estonia being a part of the Nordic region, both in geographic terms and according to recent scientific studies, thus also culturally – blending the organizational culture of the company with what a Northern European company culture is expected to be, built on soft values and democratic rules. The country's leaders, who were involved in launching the brand, also wished that the name would reflect this "nordicness" clearly, thus forming a first idea of the national carrier. Erik Urva, a former CEO of the company, also underlined that “Nordica is a logical follow-up for its previous name, the Nordic Aviation Group”.

During the first year of activities, Slovenian Adria Airways operated most of Nordica's flights, whilst Nordica was building up its fleet and crew. On 19 November 2016, Nordica entered into a strategic partnership with LOT Polish Airlines, using the latter's commercial platform, ticketing system and flight code. Since most of the flights were marketed by LOT Polish Airlines, which owned 49% shares of the Nordica's subsidiary Regional Jet, still a member of Star Alliance, Nordica also carried LOT's flight codes and callsign on most of its flights. However, the partnership came to and end in early 2021, when Nordica acquired all LOT shares in Xfly (former Regional Jet) and became its sole owner.

In March 2018, Nordica opened a base at Groningen Airport Eelde, in the north of the Netherlands. The base served four routes: to Copenhagen and Munich throughout the year and Ibiza and Nice in the summer. In November 2018, Nordica announced it would shut down eight of its routes from Tallinn Airport from the summer schedule of 2019. Additionally, the carrier closed its base in Groningen by 29 December 2018.

In June 2019, Nordica announced it would terminate all remaining scheduled operations from its home base in Tallinn due to the very high competition and loss-making routes on the local market. While a few key routes would shortly be taken over by the company’s partner airline LOT Polish Airlines, Nordica would focus its services on wet-lease operations for other airlines with the ambition to expand.

Rebranding of Nordica’s subsidiary, Regional Jet 
In February 2020, in the turmoil of the global corona pandemics, Nordica's subsidiary Regional Jet announced its successful rebranding to Xfly, eyeing new opportunities for business growth. The company also expressed interest in expanding the operations by leasing seven Embraer 190/195s. However, these plans were never put to practice because of the global pandemic. The rebranding boosted the growth and expansion of the company. Today Xfly and Nordica operate together a fleet of 17 aircraft, three more are being added in spring 2023.

Expansion 
In July 2021, Xfly announced it was planning to uptake operations other airlines had been ramping up due to pandemic-related low-season in aviation. The management of the company saw opportunities to secure ACMI service contracts throughout Europe from 2021. In the end of the year, the group touched the verge of 600 employees of 30 different nationalities.

The fleet 
Through its subsidiary Xfly in a partnership with Scandinavian Airlines, Xfly operates six ATR72-600s and seven Bombardier CRJ-900s between Scandinavian and other Northern European destinations.

Today Xfly and Nordica operate a fleet of 17 aircraft consisting of ATR72-600s, CRJ900s and A320s, where three Airbus A320neo state of the art, emission reduced aircraft will empower the growth of the company in a sustainable manner from spring 2023. Headquartered in Tallinn, Nordica and its subsidiary Xfly have bases in Stockholm, Copenhagen, Turku, Aarhus, Gällivare, Vilnius, Lisbon, Munich and Hamburg.

The Group 
The Nordic Aviation Group, a proud owner of two trusted CPA airlines, Nordica and Xfly, is an employer to over 600 people of 30 different nationalities. Xfly Aviation Academy is also formally part of the group, making sure the company can keep recruiting new pilots in a globally foreseen future shortage of aviation specialists. The maintenance team of the company has grown three times in the years 2020–2022, and in autumn 2022, the so called PART145 was nominated Estonia's top three management teams by the Estonian Aviation Academy.

Codeshare agreements 
Nordica currently uses no code share agreements. The company used a codeshare agreement with Lufthansa in operating connections for Munich.

Destinations

As of October 2017, Nordica served several cities, mainly throughout Central, Northern and Western Europe.

Codeshare agreements 
 Nordica currently uses no codeshare agreemeents in operations

Fleet

As of April 2022, the Nordica fleet consists of the following aircraft:

References

External links

Airlines of Estonia
Airlines established in 2015
Companies based in Tallinn
Estonian brands
Government-owned airlines
2015 establishments in Estonia